The Talented Mr. Ripley is a 1999 American psychological thriller film written and directed by Anthony Minghella, and based on Patricia Highsmith's 1955 novel of the same name. It stars Matt Damon as Tom Ripley, with Jude Law, Gwyneth Paltrow, Cate Blanchett and Philip Seymour Hoffman in supporting roles. The film was a critical and commercial success, grossing $128 million worldwide. It received five Academy Award nominations, including Best Adapted Screenplay and Best Supporting Actor for Law.

Plot 
In 1958, Tom Ripley is approached by shipping magnate Herbert Greenleaf, who believes that Ripley attended Princeton with his son, Dickie, because Ripley wears a borrowed Princeton jacket. Greenleaf pays Ripley to travel to Italy, where Dickie has settled, to persuade him to return to the United States. After a first-class ocean liner voyage, Ripley pretends to be Dickie in the Italian ship terminal and befriends an American socialite, Meredith Logue.

In the seaside village of Mongibello, Ripley befriends Dickie and his girlfriend Marge Sherwood, claiming to be Dickie's former Princeton classmate. Ripley enjoys Dickie's extravagant lifestyle and becomes obsessed with him. Eventually, Dickie tires of him and starts spending time with his socialite friend Freddie Miles, who treats Ripley with contempt. When he returns from Rome, Dickie catches Ripley dressed in his clothes and dancing in front of a mirror, which disturbs him.

When Dickie impregnates a local woman and spurns her, she drowns herself. Ripley, aware of what has happened, promises a guilt-ridden Dickie to keep it a secret. After Dickie's father cuts off Ripley's travel funds, Dickie cancels a trip to Venice and tells Ripley that they should part ways, but offers to take him on a final trip to San Remo. They argue aboard a small boat; Dickie says that he has grown tired of Ripley and is going to marry Marge, while Ripley insists that Dickie is afraid of the feelings they have for each other. The argument becomes physical, and Ripley kills Dickie with an oar. He takes Dickie's belongings and scuttles the boat.

Realizing that people mistake him for Dickie, Ripley assumes his identity. He forges a letter to Marge, convincing her that Dickie has left her and moved to Rome. He creates the illusion that Dickie is still alive by checking into one hotel as Dickie and another as himself, fabricating an exchange of communications between the two. Through forgery, he is able to draw on Dickie's allowance, which allows him to live lavishly. He runs into Meredith, who still knows him as Dickie, in Rome, and accepts an invitation from her to attend an opera with her family. Ripley's ruse is threatened when he unexpectedly runs into Marge and her friend Peter Smith-Kingsley at the opera. Ripley rushes Meredith out of the opera house on a pretext, then rejects her to prevent himself from being exposed.

Freddie shows up at Ripley's apartment looking for Dickie. When the landlady addresses Ripley as Dickie, Freddie realizes the fraud. Ripley bludgeons Freddie to death and disposes of his body. After the body is found, police visit the apartment to question "Dickie". To evade the police and Marge, both of whom are looking for Dickie, Ripley forges a suicide note with "Dickie" claiming responsibility for Freddie's death. Under his real name, Ripley travels to Venice, where he again encounters Peter. 

Dickie's father arrives in Italy with a private detective, Alvin MacCarron, and meets with the police. Ripley tries to kill Marge after she discovers that he has Dickie's rings, but they are interrupted by Peter. Mr. Greenleaf dismisses Marge's suspicions and MacCarron tells Ripley that the police are convinced that Dickie, who had a history of violence, murdered Freddie before killing himself. MacCarron tells Ripley that Greenleaf intends to bequeath a portion of Dickie's trust fund to him to reward his loyalty to Dickie and to ensure his silence.

Free and clear of his crimes, Ripley boards a ship to Greece with Peter; it is implied they are now lovers. Ripley is surprised to encounter Meredith, who still believes he is Dickie and also knows Peter socially. Ripley kisses her and promises to talk later. In his cabin, Peter tells Ripley he saw him kiss Meredith, and demands answers. Ripley realizes that he will have to kill Peter, as it is only a matter of time before Peter and Meredith run into each other and Meredith, who is traveling with family, would be missed. After apologizing to Peter for lying to him, a sobbing Ripley smothers him to death and returns to his cabin, alone.

Cast

Production

Casting 
The Guardian reported that Leonardo DiCaprio declined the role which went to Damon. Minghella cast Matt Damon after seeing his performance in Good Will Hunting, because he felt the actor had the right mix of "credibility and warmth and generosity" to engage the audience and help them understand how Ripley "thinks and operates". The character of Meredith Logue, not present in the novel, was added by Minghella with Cate Blanchett in mind. He was "entranced" with Blanchett after meeting with her and surprised that she was actually interested in playing the small part; Minghella went on to write more scenes for the character to expand her role.

Minghella happened to see the dailies from a film his wife Caroline Choa was producing at the time, which Law starred in: The Wisdom of Crocodiles. Minghella was impressed with Law's performance and offered him the role of Dickie; in his "insane arrogance", as Law put it, he initially refused, because he did not wish to play a "pretty boy". After learning of the cast Minghella was assembling and coming to understand that he would be "in safe hands" with the director, Law later accepted the part.

Filming 
Apart from the beginning scenes filmed in New York City, the film was shot entirely on location in Italy. The cliffside resort town of Positano and various villages on the islands of Ischia and Procida, near Naples, were used to represent the fictional town of Mongibello. Frequent and unpredictable rain hampered the production, with Minghella stating that "we had to deliver this gorgeous Mediterranean world, this beautiful world of Southern Italy, and we could never get Italy to turn beautiful...We would divide the scenes up, often into words, and go out and get two or three words and then it would start to rain and we'd have to go back in again." The scenes taking place in San Remo were actually filmed in Anzio, a resort town near Rome. Well-known locations included the Piazza Navona, the Spanish Steps and Piazza di Spagna in Rome, and the Caffè Florian in the Piazza San Marco in Venice.

To prepare for the role of Ripley, Damon lost 30 pounds and learned to play the piano. Law gained weight and learned to play the saxophone for his character; he also broke a rib when he fell backward while filming the murder scene in the boat.

Music

Reception

Critical response 
Roger Ebert gave the film four-out-of-four stars, calling it "an intelligent thriller" that is "insidious in the way it leads us to identify with Tom Ripley ... He's a monster, but we want him to get away with it". In her review for The New York Times, Janet Maslin praised Law's performance: "This is a star-making role for the preternaturally talented English actor Jude Law. Beyond being devastatingly good-looking, Mr. Law gives Dickie the manic, teasing powers of manipulation that make him ardently courted by every man or woman he knows". 

Entertainment Weekly gave the film an "A−" rating, and Lisa Schwarzbaum wrote: "Damon is at once an obvious choice for the part and a hard sell to audiences soothed by his amiable boyishness ... the facade works surprisingly well when Damon holds that gleaming smile just a few seconds too long, his Eagle Scout eyes fixed just a blink more than the calm gaze of any non-murdering young man. And in that opacity we see horror".

Charlotte O'Sullivan of Sight & Sound  wrote, "A tense, troubling thriller, marred only by problems of pacing (the middle section drags) and some implausible characterisation (Meredith's obsession with Ripley never convinces), it's full of vivid, miserable life". Time named it one of the ten best films of the year and called it a "devious twist on the Patricia Highsmith crime novel". 

James Berardinelli gave the film two and a half stars out of four, calling it "a solid adaptation" that "will hold a viewer's attention", but criticized "Damon's weak performance" and "a running time that's about 15 minutes too long." Berardinelli compared the film unfavorably with the previous adaptation, Purple Noon, which he gave four stars. He wrote, "The remake went back to the source material, Patricia Highsmith's The Talented Mr. Ripley. The result, while arguably truer to the events of Highsmith's book, is vastly inferior. To say it suffers by comparison to Purple Noon is an understatement. Almost every aspect of René Clément's 1960 motion picture is superior to that of Minghella's 1999 version, from the cinematography to the acting to the screenplay. Matt Damon might make a credible Tom Ripley, but only for those who never experienced Alain Delon's portrayal."

In his review for The New York Observer, Andrew Sarris wrote, "On balance, The Talented Mr. Ripley is worth seeing more for its undeniably delightful journey than its final destination. Perhaps wall-to-wall amorality and triumphant evil leave too sour an aftertaste even for the most sophisticated anti-Hollywood palate". 

In his review for The Guardian, Peter Bradshaw wrote, "The Talented Mr. Ripley begins as an ingenious exposition of the great truth about charming people having something to hide: namely, their utter reliance on others. It ends up as a dismayingly unthrilling thriller and bafflingly unconvincing character study". 

In her review for The Village Voice, Amy Taubin criticized Minghella as a "would-be art film director who never takes his eye off the box office, doesn't allow himself to become embroiled in such complexity. He turns The Talented Mr. Ripley into a splashy tourist trap of a movie. The effect is rather like reading the National Enquirer in a café overlooking the Adriatic".

Director Florian Henckel von Donnersmarck has cited The Talented Mr. Ripley as one of his favorite films of all time. He hired its composer, Gabriel Yared, to write a theme for his own film, The Lives of Others, and its cinematographer, John Seale, to work on his second feature, The Tourist.

As of 2022 Rotten Tomatoes, the film has an approval rating of 85% based on 136 reviews, with an average rating of 7.40/10. The site's critics consensus reads, "With Matt Damon's unsettling performance offering a darkly twisted counterpoint to Anthony Minghella's glossy direction, The Talented Mr. Ripley is a suspense thriller that lingers." 

On Metacritic the film has a weighted average score of 76 out of 100 based on 35 critics, indicating "generally favorable reviews". Audiences surveyed by CinemaScore gave the film an average grade of "C+" on an A+ to F scale.

Accolades

Adaptations

The Talented Mr Ripley is the third big-screen Ripley adaptation, following 1960's Purple Noon and 1977's The American Friend. It was followed by 2002's Ripley's Game and 2005's Ripley Under Ground, but none of the films form an official series. The Talented Mr Ripley is the most popular Ripley adaptation.

Notes

References

External links 

 
 
 
 
 
 
 Shooting script by Anthony Minghella

1999 films
1999 drama films
1999 crime drama films
1999 crime thriller films
1999 LGBT-related films
1990s English-language films
1990s psychological thriller films
1990s thriller drama films
American crime drama films
American crime thriller films
American LGBT-related films
American psychological drama films
American psychological thriller films
American thriller drama films
BAFTA winners (films)
Films about con artists
Films about identity theft
Films about murderers
Films about the upper class
Films based on American crime novels
Films based on works by Patricia Highsmith
Films directed by Anthony Minghella
Films scored by Gabriel Yared
Films set in 1958
Films set in 1959
Films set in New York City
Films set in Rome
Films set in Venice
Films shot in Rome
Films shot in Venice
LGBT-related drama films
LGBT-related thriller films
Male bisexuality in film
Miramax films
Paramount Pictures films
1990s American films